This is a list of the instructions that make up the Java bytecode, an abstract machine language that is ultimately executed by the Java virtual machine. The Java bytecode is generated from languages running on the Java Platform, most notably the Java programming language.

Note that any referenced "value" refers to a 32-bit int as per the Java instruction set.

See also 
Jazelle DBX (Direct Bytecode eXecution), a feature that executes some Java bytecodes in hardware, on some ARM9 CPUs
Common Intermediate Language (CIL), a similar bytecode specification that runs on the CLR of the .NET Framework

References

External links 
The Java Virtual Machine Instruction Set

Instruction set listings
Java platform